Silver 'n Wood is an album by jazz pianist Horace Silver released on the Blue Note label in 1975 featuring performances by Silver with Tom Harrell, Bob Berg, Ron Carter and Al Foster, with an overdubbed horn section conducted by Wade Marcus featuring Buddy Collette, Fred Jackson, Jr., Jerome Richardson, Lanny Morgan, Jack Nimitz, Bill Green, Garnett Brown, and Frank Rosolino.

Reception
The Allmusic review by Scott Yanow awarded the album 3 stars and states: "The two sidelong works ('The Tranquilizer Suite' and 'The Process of Creation Suite') are not all that memorable but the music overall (helped out by strong solos) is typical Silver hard bop".

Track listing
All compositions by Horace Silver
 "The Tranquilizer Suite Part 1: Keep On Gettin' Up" -
 "The Tranquilizer Suite Part 2: Slow Down" -
 "The Tranquilizer Suite Part 3: Time And Effort" -
 "The Tranquilizer Suite, Part 4: Perseverance And Endurance" -
 "The Process Of Creation Suite Part 1: Motivation" -
 "The Process Of Creation Suite Part 2: Activation" -
 "The Process Of Creation Suite Part 3: Assimilation" -
 "The Process Of Creation Suite Part 4: Creation" -
Recorded at A&R Studios, NYC on November 7, 1975 & overdubs at Wally Heider Sound Studio III, Los Angeles, CA on January 2 & 3, 1976.

Personnel
Horace Silver - piano, arrangements
Tom Harrell - trumpet
Bob Berg - tenor saxophone
Ron Carter - bass
Al Foster - drums
Buddy Collette, Fred Jackson, Jr. - flute, piccolo
Jerome Richardson - soprano saxophone
Lanny Morgan - alto saxophone
Jack Nimitz - baritone saxophone, flute
Bill Green - bass saxophone, flute
Garnett Brown - trombone (tracks 1-4)
Frank Rosolino - trombone (tracks 5-8)
Wade Marcus - conducting

References

Horace Silver albums
1976 albums
Blue Note Records albums
Albums produced by George Butler (record producer)